Slightly Terrific is a 1944 American comedy film directed by Edward F. Cline and written by Edward Dein and Stanley Davis. The film stars Leon Errol, Anne Rooney, Eddie Quillan, Richard Lane, Betty Kean, Ray Malone, Lillian Cornell, Donald Novis and Lorraine Krueger. The film was released on May 5, 1944, by Universal Pictures.

Plot

Cast        
Leon Errol as James P. Tuttle / John P. Tuttle
Anne Rooney as Julie Bryant
Eddie Quillan as Charlie Young
Richard Lane as Mike Hamilton
Betty Kean as Marie Mason
Ray Malone as Joey Bryant
Lillian Cornell as Gypsy Queen
Donald Novis as Patrick Michael O'Toole
Lorraine Krueger as Peggy
Jayne Forrest as Valerie
Lee Bennett as Freddie Jordan

References

External links
 

1944 films
American comedy films
1944 comedy films
Universal Pictures films
Films directed by Edward F. Cline
American black-and-white films
1940s English-language films
1940s American films